Undercover Stings is an American reality documentary television series on Spike. The series debuted on May 7, 2012.

Premise
The series follows undercover police officers as they work on assigned cases. Each episodes reveals the planning, set-up, and execution of the plan. The series follows police units in cities such as  Kansas City, Missouri, Palm Beach, Florida, New Orleans, Louisiana, Savannah, Georgia and Las Vegas, Nevada.

Episodes

Season 1 (2012)

References

External links
 
 

2012 American television series debuts
2012 American television series endings
English-language television shows
Spike (TV network) original programming